"Sleepy Joe" is a song written by John Carter, and Russell Alquist and performed by  Herman's Hermits.  It reached #4 in New Zealand, #9 in Canada and Ireland, #10 in Norway, #12 in the United Kingdom, #17 in Sweden, #18 in South Africa, #21 in Australia, #61 in the United States, and #37 in Australia in 1968.

Billboard described the single as a "clever and catchy rhythm material."

The song was produced by Mickie Most.

References

1968 songs
1968 singles
Herman's Hermits songs
Song recordings produced by Mickie Most
MGM Records singles
Songs written by John Carter (musician)